was a town located in Jinseki District, Hiroshima Prefecture, Japan.

As of 2003, the town had an estimated population of 2,746 and a density of 26.41 persons per km². The total area was 103.98 km².

On November 5, 2004, Jinseki, along with the towns of Sanwa and Yuki, and the village of Toyomatsu (all from Jinseki District), was merged to create the town of Jinsekikōgen.

External links
 Official website of Jinsekikogen 

Dissolved municipalities of Hiroshima Prefecture